Tahar Haddad (1899 – December 1935) was a Tunisian author, labor activist, scholar and reformer.

Haddad, was born in Tunis to a family of shopkeepers and studied Islamic law at the Great Mosque of Zitouna from 1911 until his graduation in 1920. He became a notary; he abandoned his career to join Al-Destour, which was the first major political party to spearhead the Tunisian national movement. In the following years, he became a prominent member in the burgeoning Tunisian labor movement, and he quickly became a leading spokesperson for the movement. He left the party when he became dissatisfied with the leadership, particularly the party's negative attitude towards the labor movement.  

Haddad was a key figure in the early Tunisian Labor movement, which had emerged as a reaction to the French labor movement's reluctance to defend the interests of indigenous Tunisian workers, and was active for over a decade. However, he would later be known first and foremost as a pioneering Tunisian feminist. In the 1930 book Our Women in the Shari 'a and Society he advocated for expanded rights for women and said that the interpretations of Islam at the time inhibited women.  Although reactions to this publication in Tunisian intelligentsia as well as the general public were harsh initially, he would be rehabilitated in posterity by the neo destour party in their own bid to advance feminist and modernizing reform, and elevated to a national icon.

Haddad was never exiled at the time where the French colonial government sent his friend and co-founder of the CGTT labor union into exile. For a short period of time, he became the leader of the trade union movement. Haddad died of tuberculosis. His final years were marked by social withdrawal and depression, as he was shunned by virtually the entire legal, theological, clerical and intellectual establishment for his feminist views. He was thus forbidden from attending his university exams, being kicked out of the exam hall. Several fatwas were issued declaring him a heretic, some by prominent religious authorities, with some going as far as declaring him an apostate, Most notably the prominent religious authority Taher ben Achour. He was also forbidden from marrying, and several works were written to rebuke him, both within Tunisia and in the wider Arab world.

References

1899 births
1935 deaths
Male feminists
Tunisian feminists
Tunisian writers
Tunisian scholars
Proponents of Islamic feminism
20th-century deaths from tuberculosis
Tuberculosis deaths in Tunisia